Elemér Berkessy (20 June 1905 – 7 July 1993), also referred to as Emilio Berkessy or Emil Berkessy, was a Hungarian footballer and coach.

Playing career
Berkessy joined Ferencváros in 1928, and with them he was the champion of Hungary twice, in 1927-28 and in 1931-32, helping his team winning the championship with a 100 percent result in the 1931-32 season. He was also part of the team that won the 1927-28 Hungarian Cup and the 1928 Mitropa Cup. He was also capped 7 times for Hungary.

He then moved to Western Europe, first in the newly founded Division 1 with RC Paris, before moving to FC Barcelona, and coming back to end his player career in France with Le Havre AC of Division 2.

Coach career
After his playing career, he became a coach, starting off as the head coach of Tatabánya Miner in 1939. Between 1941 and 1947 he coached four other Hungarian teams (Salgótarján Miner, Szegedi VSE, Ferencváros, Szegedi AK), but the highlight of his coaching career came in Italy with Vicenza Calcio, A.S. Biellese 1902, Rosignano Calcio and Spain with Real Zaragoza, RCD Espanyol and Sabadell. He also became the first foreign manager in the Football League in 1954 with Grimsby Town F.C.

Honours
Ferencvárosi TC
Hungarian Championship League
Champions (2): 1927-28 and 1931-32
Runner-up (3): 1928-29 and 1929-30

Hungarian Cup
Champions (1): 1927–28
Runner-up (1): 1931–32

Mitropa Cup
Champions (1): 1928 Mitropa Cup

References

External links
 
La Liga player stats

1905 births
1993 deaths
Sportspeople from Oradea
Romanian sportspeople of Hungarian descent
Association football midfielders
Hungarian footballers
Hungary international footballers
Hungarian expatriate footballers
Expatriate footballers in Romania
Liga I players
CA Oradea players
CSM Jiul Petroșani players
Hungarian expatriate sportspeople in Romania
Ferencvárosi TC footballers
Expatriate footballers in France
Ligue 1 players
Racing Club de France Football players
Hungarian expatriate sportspeople in France
Expatriate footballers in Spain
La Liga players
FC Barcelona players
Hungarian expatriate sportspeople in Spain
Ligue 2 players
Le Havre AC players
Hungarian football managers
Hungarian expatriate football managers
Ferencvárosi TC managers
L.R. Vicenza managers
Expatriate football managers in Italy
Hungarian expatriate sportspeople in Italy
Aurora Pro Patria 1919 managers
Rosignano Calcio managers
La Liga managers
Real Zaragoza managers
Expatriate football managers in Spain
Grimsby Town F.C. managers
Expatriate football managers in England
Hungarian expatriate sportspeople in England
Beerschot A.C. managers
Expatriate football managers in Belgium
Hungarian expatriate sportspeople in Belgium
RCD Espanyol managers
CE Sabadell FC managers
Catalonia international guest footballers
A.S.D. La Biellese managers